Timo Hirvonen (born December 5, 1973) is a Finnish former professional ice hockey player. Hirvonen made his Liiga debut playing with Kiekko-Espoo during the 1992–93 SM-liiga season, and served as an assistant coach with the Espoo Blues until their bankruptcy.

Career statistics

References

External links

1973 births
Living people
Espoo Blues players
Finnish ice hockey left wingers
SaiPa players
Malmö Redhawks players
People from Varkaus
Sportspeople from North Savo